Maja Cvjetković (born 31 December 1985) is a Croatian model. She was Miss Croatia in 2005.

References

Living people
1985 births
People from Šibenik
Miss World 2005 delegates
Croatian female models
Croatian beauty pageant winners